Manuel Silva (born 5 January 1954) is a Portuguese racing cyclist. He rode in the 1975 Tour de France.

References

1954 births
Living people
Portuguese male cyclists
Place of birth missing (living people)